Dermatophytids are fungus-free disseminated skin lesions resulting from induced sensitization in patients with ringworm infections.

See also 
 Candidid
 Skin lesion

References

External links 

Animal fungal diseases
Mycosis-related cutaneous conditions